KMLY is a Regional Mexican class A radio station in Gonzales, California.

History
KMLY went on the air on July 4, 2012, originally licensed to serve Carmel Valley, California at 105.9 FM.

References

External links
 

2012 establishments in California
Mass media in Monterey County, California
MLY
Radio stations established in 2012